Oenomaus ambiguus is a species of butterfly of the family Lycaenidae. It is found in French Guiana and Amazonian Peru.

References

Butterflies described in 2008
Eumaeini